Peter Pagel (24 February 1956 – 12 December 2010) was a professional German footballer.

Pagel made a total of 10 appearances in the 2. Bundesliga for Tennis Borussia Berlin and Hertha BSC during his playing career.

Pagel died suddenly at the age of 54.

References

External links 
 

1956 births
2010 deaths
German footballers
Association football forwards
2. Bundesliga players
Tennis Borussia Berlin players
Hertha BSC players
FC 08 Homburg players
20th-century German people